The Berlin Marathon is a marathon event held annually on the streets of Berlin, Germany on the last weekend of September.

Events are split over two days, with skaters competing on the marathon course on Saturday before the running events. Power walkers, hand-bikers, wheelchair riders, and a children's marathon (1/10 of the regular distance) are also part of the marathon weekend, which is organised by SCC EVENTS. The elite running and wheelchair races are part of the World Marathon Majors, an annual series of top level races offering a $1 million prize purse. BMW is the current title sponsor for the race.

The city's flat course regularly produces fast performances and the marathon world record has been broken in Berlin on twelve occasions, particularly the most recent eight instances on the men's progression. The current record was set at the 2022 edition, where Eliud Kipchoge won the men's race in 2:01:09. Tigist Assefa set a new women's course record that same year with 2:15:37.

History
The Berlin Marathon was established in 1974 by Horst Milde, a baker and running enthusiast in the city. The race had 244 finishers; 234 men and 10 women, and was won by Günter Hallas and Jutta von Haase in times of 2:44:53 and 3:22:01 respectively. In 1977, Christa Vahlensieck established a new women's world record at the Berlin Marathon, running 2:34:47. Four years later, the race started outside the Reichstag for the first time, by which time it had grown to 2,583 finishers, making it the largest city road race in Germany. The following year, before German unification, some East Germans secretly ran the race, registering under false names to avoid recriminations from the East German secret service. In 1989, a children's race was added to the event, and eight years later an inline skating marathon was contested.

In 1998, Ronaldo da Costa set a new men's world record, the only South American to hold a marathon world record. Two years later, one of the race's pacemakers, Simon Biwott won the race, after one of the favourites had pulled out in the second half of the race. In 2001, Naoko Takahashi became the first woman to run a sub-2:20 marathon, completing the Berlin Marathon in 2:19:46. The race had continued to be the venue of world records; between 2003 and 2018, seven men's records were set at the race; the most recent remains as the current world record time; Eliud Kipchoge's 2:01:39.

The event was held in mid-September in 2000 and 2018, because of a conflict with the Women's Olympic Marathon, and due to German Unity Day preparations, respectively.

The 2020 edition of the event was prohibited from being held on its originally scheduled dates due to the coronavirus pandemic, and was eventually cancelled once it was clear that it would not be possible to hold it at a later date in 2020. All registrants were given the option of either transferring their entry to 2021 or obtaining a refund.

Course

The course within the metropolis starts and finishes near the Brandenburg Gate. Due to the division of the city, the marathon events before 1990 were limited to West Berlin only. On 30 September 1990 athletes were able to run through the Brandenburg Gate for the first time and since then, the course has covered both halves of the unified city. It was reported that a great many of the runners had tears in their eyes as they ran through the gate.

Nowadays, after leaving Brandenburg Gate, the course passes Charlottenburg, around Tiergarten, along Moabit and Mitte, and then south to Friedrichshain. After that, it winds west between Kreuzberg and Neukölln, through Schöneberg, over to Friedenau and Zehlendorf, before turning north back toward the city's center. Looping above Schöneberg, the course comes full circle as it finishes through the Gate.

There have been two other major international marathons in Berlin. At the 1936 Olympic Games and at the 2009 IAAF World Championships, both using different routes. A marathon in Berlin on 14 Oct 1973 was won by Ulrich Hutmacher (GER) with a time of 2:19:32, but that race is not considered to be part of the Berlin Marathon series.

Sponsors
There have been several title sponsors in the race's history. From 1974 until 1989 it was just the Berlin Marathon. In 1990, it was the Yanase Berlin Marathon. In 1991 and 1992 it was the Canon Berlin Marathon. It reverted to simply the Berlin Marathon from 1993 until 1997. It then became the Alberto Berlin Marathon in 1998 and 1999. A new title sponsor changed the name to the real,- Berlin Marathon from 2000 to 2010. Since 2011 it has been called the BMW Berlin Marathon.

Finishers 

In terms of finishing athletes, Berlin is one of four world-wide marathons with more than 40,000 finishers, along with the New York City Marathon, Chicago Marathon, and Paris Marathon.

Elite race

World records

Winners

Key:
  Current course record
  German championship race

Inline skating race

An inline skating section was added to the marathon event in 1997. A total of 5081 people took part in this section in the 2019 race. It is considered the largest inline skater marathon in the world and is the final venue of the World Inline Cup. The men's and women's race records are held by Bart Swings (56:49 in 2015) and Maira Yaqueline Arias (1:06:35 in 2017).

Key: Course record (in bold)

Handcycle race 
A handcycle race was first held at the race in 2004. In 2008, 166 handcyclists participated in the Berlin Marathon. The men's and women's race records are held by Jetze Plat (1:00:01 in 2019) and Christiane Reppe (1:08:54 in 2016).

Key: Course record (in bold)

Wheelchair race

A wheelchair section was first officially held at the Berlin Marathon in 1981. Only men competed that year. The wheelchair race typically starts earlier in the day before the runners and power walkers.

Heinz Frei is the most successful athlete, with twenty wins in the men's race. The next most successful athlete is Manuela Schär, who has won the women's race six times. Both these athletes also hold the records for time, with Frei setting the men's race record of 1:21:39 in 1997 and Schär setting the women's race record of 1:36:53 in 2018.

Key: Course record (in bold)

See also 
 List of marathon races in Europe
 Sport in Berlin

Notes

References

External links

World Marathon Majors – Berlin Marathon at the World Marathon Majors
Berlin Marathon at YouRace – Interactive course map and elevation profile

 
Marathons in Germany
Handcycling competitions
Inline speed skating competitions
Wheelchair marathons
World Marathon Majors
Athletics in Berlin
Marathon
Annual events in Berlin
Annual sporting events in Germany
Autumn events in Germany
September sporting events
Recurring sporting events established in 1974
1974 establishments in Germany